{{Infobox military conflict
| conflict          = Warsaw Ghetto Uprising
| partof            = World War II and the Holocaust
| image             = Stroop Report - Warsaw Ghetto Uprising BW.jpg
| alt               = A Jewish boy surrenders in Warsaw, from the Stroop Report to Heinrich Himmler from May 1943
| image_size        = 300px
| caption           = Jewish women and children forcibly removed from a bunker; one of the most iconic pictures of World War II.
| date              = 19 April – 16 May 1943
| place             = Warsaw Ghetto, General Government
| coordinates       = 
| result            = Uprising defeated
 Surviving Jews deported to Majdanek and Treblinka
| combatant1        = 
| combatant2        = 

| commander1        = 
| commander2        = 
| strength1         = Daily average of 2,090, including 821 Waffen-SS
| strength2         = About 600 ŻOB and about 400 ŻZW fighters, plus a number of Polish fighters
| casualties1       = German figures:17 killed93 woundedJewish resistance estimate:300 casualties<ref name=McDonough>McDonough, Frank: The Hitler Years, Volume 2: Disaster 1940–1945, p. 396</ref>
| casualties2       = 56,065 killed/and or captured of which approximately 36,000 deported to extermination camps (German estimate)
| notes             = 
}}

The Warsaw Ghetto Uprising was the 1943 act of Jewish resistance in the Warsaw Ghetto in German-occupied Poland during World War II to oppose Nazi Germany's final effort to transport the remaining ghetto population to Majdanek and Treblinka death camps.

After the Grossaktion Warsaw of summer 1942, in which more than a quarter of a million Jews were deported from the ghetto to Treblinka and murdered, the remaining Jews began to build bunkers and smuggle weapons and explosives into the ghetto. The left-wing Jewish Combat Organization (ŻOB) and right-wing Jewish Military Union (ŻZW) formed and began to train. A small resistance effort to another roundup in January 1943 was partially successful and spurred Polish resistance groups to support the Jews in earnest.

The uprising started on 19 April when the ghetto refused to surrender to the police commander SS-Brigadeführer Jürgen Stroop, who ordered the burning of the ghetto, block by block, ending on 16 May. A total of 13,000 Jews were killed, about half of them burnt alive or suffocated. German casualties were probably fewer than 150, with Stroop reporting 110 casualties [16 killed + 1 dead/93 wounded].

The uprising was the largest single revolt by Jews during World War II. The Jews knew they couldn't win and that their survival was unlikely. Marek Edelman, the only surviving ŻOB commander, said their inspiration to fight was "not to allow the Germans alone to pick the time and place of our deaths". According to the United States Holocaust Memorial Museum, the uprising was "one of the most significant occurrences in the history of the Jewish people".

 Background 

In 1939, German authorities began to concentrate Poland's population of over three million Jews into a number of extremely crowded ghettos located in large Polish cities. The largest of these, the Warsaw Ghetto, collected approximately 300,000–400,000 people into a densely packed, 3.3 km2 central area of Warsaw. Thousands of Jews were killed by rampant disease and starvation under SS-und-Polizeiführer Odilo Globocnik and SS-Standartenführer Ludwig Hahn, even before the mass deportations from the ghetto to the Treblinka extermination camp began.

The SS conducted many of the deportations during the operation code-named Grossaktion Warschau, between 23 July and 21 September 1942. Just before the operation began, the German "Resettlement Commissioner" SS-Sturmbannführer Hermann Höfle called a meeting of the Ghetto Jewish Council Judenrat and informed its leader, Adam Czerniaków, that he would require 7,000 Jews a day for the "resettlement to the East". Czerniaków committed suicide once he became aware of the true goal of the "resettlement" plan. Approximately 254,000–300,000 ghetto residents were murdered at Treblinka during the two-month-long operation. The Grossaktion was directed by SS-Oberführer Ferdinand von Sammern-Frankenegg, the SS and police commander of the Warsaw area since 1941.

He was relieved of duty by SS-und-Polizeiführer Jürgen Stroop, sent to Warsaw by Heinrich Himmler on 17 April 1943. Stroop took over from von Sammern-Frankenegg following the failure of the latter to pacify the ghetto resistance.

When the deportations first began, members of the Jewish resistance movement met and decided not to fight the SS directives, believing that the Jews were being sent to labour camps and not to be murdered. But by the end of 1942, ghetto inhabitants learned that the deportations were part of an extermination process. Many of the remaining Jews decided to revolt. The first armed resistance in the ghetto occurred in January 1943.

On 19 April 1943, Passover eve, the Germans entered the ghetto. The remaining Jews knew that the Germans would murder them and they decided to resist to the last. While the uprising was underway, the Bermuda Conference was held by the Allies from 19 to 29 April 1943 to discuss the Jewish refugee problem. Discussions included the question of Jewish refugees who had been liberated by Allied forces and those who still remained within German-occupied Europe.

 The uprising 
 January revolt 
On 18 January 1943, the Germans began their second deportation of the Jews, which led to the first instance of armed insurgency within the ghetto. While Jewish families hid in their so-called "bunkers", fighters of the ŻZW, joined by elements of the ŻOB, resisted, engaging the Germans in direct clashes. Though the ŻZW and ŻOB suffered heavy losses (including some of their leaders), the Germans also took casualties, and the deportation was halted within a few days. Only 5,000 Jews were removed, instead of the 8,000 planned by Globocnik.

Hundreds of people in the Warsaw Ghetto were ready to fight, adults and children, sparsely armed with handguns, gasoline bottles, and a few other weapons that had been smuggled into the ghetto by resistance fighters. Most of the Jewish fighters did not view their actions as an effective measure by which to save themselves, but rather as a battle for the honour of the Jewish people, and a protest against the world's silence.

 Preparations 
Two resistance organizations, the ŻZW and ŻOB, took control of the ghetto. They built dozens of fighting posts and executed a number of Nazi collaborators, including Jewish Ghetto Police officers, members of the fake (German-sponsored and controlled) resistance organization Żagiew, as well as Gestapo and Abwehr agents (including the alleged agent and Judenrat associate Dr Alfred Nossig, executed on 22 February 1943). The ŻOB established a prison to hold and execute traitors and collaborators. Józef Szeryński, former head of the Jewish Ghetto Police, committed suicide.

 Main revolt 

On 19 April 1943, on the eve of Passover, the police and SS auxiliary forces entered the ghetto. They were planning to complete the deportation action within three days, but were ambushed by Jewish insurgents firing and tossing Molotov cocktails and hand grenades from alleyways, sewers, and windows. The Germans suffered 59 casualties and their advance bogged down. Two of their combat vehicles (an armed conversion of a French-made Lorraine 37L light armored vehicle and an armored car) were set on fire by the insurgents' petrol bombs.

Following von Sammern-Frankenegg's failure to contain the revolt, he lost his post as the SS and police commander of Warsaw. He was replaced by SS-Brigadeführer Jürgen Stroop, who rejected von Sammern-Frankenegg's proposal to call in bomber aircraft from Kraków. He led a better-organized and reinforced ground attack.

The longest-lasting defense of a position took place around the ŻZW stronghold at Muranowski Square, where the ŻZW chief leader, Dawid Moryc Apfelbaum, was killed in combat. On the afternoon of 19 April, a symbolic event took place when two boys climbed up on the roof of a building on the square and raised two flags, the red-and-white Polish flag and the blue-and-white banner of the ŻZW. These flags remained there, highly visible from the Warsaw streets, for four days.

During this fight on 22 April, SS officer Hans Dehmke was killed when gunfire detonated a hand grenade he was holding. When Stroop's ultimatum to surrender was rejected by the defenders, his forces resorted to systematically burning houses block by block using flamethrowers and fire bottles, and blowing up basements and sewers. "We were beaten by the flames, not the Germans," survivor Marek Edelman said in 2007; he was deputy commander of the ŻOB and escaped the ghetto in its last days. In 2003, he recalled: "The sea of flames flooded houses and courtyards. ... There was no air, only black, choking smoke and heavy burning heat radiating from the red-hot walls, from the glowing stone stairs." The "bunker wars" lasted an entire month, during which German progress was slowed.

While the battle continued inside the ghetto, Polish resistance groups AK and GL engaged the Germans between 19 and 23 April at six different locations outside the ghetto walls, firing at German sentries and positions. In one attack, three units of the AK under the command of Captain Józef Pszenny ("Chwacki") joined up in a failed attempt to breach the ghetto walls with explosives. Eventually, the ŻZW lost all of its commanders. On 29 April, the remaining fighters from the organization escaped the ghetto through the Muranowski tunnel and relocated to the Michalin forest. This event marked the end of significant fighting.

At this point, organized defense collapsed. Surviving fighters and thousands of remaining Jewish civilians took cover in the sewer system and in the many dugout hiding places hidden among the ruins of the ghetto, referred to as "bunkers" by Germans and Jews alike. The Germans used dogs to detect such hideouts, then usually dropped smoke bombs to force people out. Sometimes they flooded these so-called bunkers or destroyed them with explosives. On occasions, shootouts occurred. A number of captured fighters lobbed hidden grenades or fired concealed handguns after surrendering. There were also clashes at night between small groups of insurgents and German patrols at night.

On 8 May, the Germans discovered a large dugout located at Miła 18 Street, which served as ŻOB's main command post. Most of the organization's remaining leadership and dozens of others committed mass suicide by ingesting cyanide, including Mordechaj Anielewicz, the chief commander of ŻOB. His deputy Marek Edelman escaped the ghetto through the sewers with a handful of comrades two days later.

On 10 May, Szmul Zygielbojm, a Bundist member of the Polish government in exile, committed suicide in London to protest the lack of action on behalf of the Jews by the Allied governments. In his farewell note, he wrote:

 The suppression of the uprising officially ended on 16 May 1943, when Stroop personally pushed a detonator button to demolish the Great Synagogue of Warsaw.

Besides claiming an estimated 56,065 Jews accounted for (although his own figures showed the number to be 57,065) and noting that "The number of destroyed dug-outs amounts to 631," in his official report dated 24 May 1943, Stroop listed the following as captured booty:

Sporadic resistance continued and the last skirmish took place on 5 June 1943 between Germans and a holdout group of armed Jews without connections to the resistance organizations.

 Casualties 

13,000 Jews were killed in the ghetto during the uprising (some 6,000 among them were burnt alive or died from smoke inhalation). Of the remaining 50,000 residents, almost all were captured and shipped to the death camps of Majdanek and Treblinka.

Jürgen Stroop's internal SS daily report for Friedrich Krüger, written on 16 May 1943, stated:

According to the casualty lists in Stroop's report, German forces suffered a total of 110 casualties – 17 dead (of whom 16 were killed in action) and 93 injured – of whom 101 are listed by name, including over 60 members of the Waffen-SS. These figures did not include Jewish collaborators, but did include the "Trawniki men" and Polish police under his command. 

Other sources have questioned the number of German casualties. Edelman claims that the German casualties amounted 300 killed and wounded. The official German  casualty figures were kept low, while the propaganda bulletins of the Polish Underground State, claimed that hundreds of occupiers had been killed in the fighting. But according to Israel Gutman, "the number cited by Stroop (16 dead, 85 wounded) cannot be rejected out of hand, but it is likely that his list was neither complete, free of errors, nor indicative of the German losses throughout the entire period of resistance, until the absolute liquidation of Jewish life in the ghetto. All the same, the German casualty figures cited by the various Jewish sources are probably highly exaggerated." Other historians such as Raul Hilberg and French L. MacLean also confim the accuracy of official German casualty figures. 

The Warsaw Ghetto Uprising was the largest single revolt by Jews during World War II.

German daily losses of killed/wounded and the official figures for killed or captured Jews and "bandits", according to the Stroop report:

 19 April: 1 killed, 24 wounded; 580 captured
 20 April: 3 killed, 10 wounded; 533 captured
 21 April: 0 killed, 5 wounded; 5,200 captured
 22 April: 3 killed, 1 wounded; 6,580 captured; 203 "Jews and bandits" killed; 35 Poles killed outside the Ghetto
 23 April: 0 killed, 3 wounded; 4,100 captured; 200 "Jews and bandits" killed; 3 Jews captured outside the Ghetto.Total of 19,450 Jews reported caught
 24 April: 0 killed, 3 wounded; 1,660 captured; 1,811 "pulled out of dugouts, about 330 shot".
 25 April: 0 killed, 4 wounded; 1,690 captured; 274 shot; "very large portion of the bandits ... captured". Total of 27,464 Jews caught
 26 April: 0 killed, 0 wounded; 1,722 captured; 1,330 "destroyed"; 362 Jews shot. 30 Jews "displaced". Total of 29,186 Jews captured
 27 April: 0 killed, 4 wounded; 2,560 captured of whom 547 shot; 24 Polish "bandits killed in battle"; 52 Polish "bandits" arrested. Total of 31,746 Jews caught
 28 April: 0 killed, 3 wounded; 1,655 captured of whom 110 killed; 10 "bandits" killed and 9 "arrested". Total of 33,401 Jews caught
 29 April: 0 killed 0 wounded; 2,359 captured of whom 106 killed
 30 April: 0 killed 0 wounded; 1,599 captured of whom 179 killed. Total of 37,359 Jews caught
 1 May: 2 killed, 2 wounded; 1,026 captured of whom 245 killed. Total of 38,385 Jews caught; 150 killed outside the Ghetto
 2 May: 0 killed, 7 wounded; 1,852 captured and 235 killed. Total of 40,237 Jews caught
 3 May: 0 killed, 3 wounded; 1,569 captured and 95 killed. Total of 41,806 Jews caught
 4 May: 0 killed, 0 wounded; 2,238 captured, of whom 204 shot. Total of 44,089 Jews caught
 5 May: 0 killed, 2 wounded; 2,250 captured
 6 May: 2 killed, 1 wounded; 1,553 captured; 356 shot
 7 May: 0 killed, 1 wounded; 1,109 captured; 255 shot. Total of 45,342 Jews caught
 8 May: 3 killed, 3 wounded; 1,091 captured and 280 killed; 60 "heavily armed bandits" caught
 9 May: 0 killed, 0 wounded; 1,037 "Jews and bandits" caught and 319 "bandits and Jews" shot. Total of 51,313 Jews caught; 254 "Jews and bandits" shot outside the Ghetto
 10 May: 0 killed, 4 wounded; 1,183 caught and 187 "bandits and Jews" shot. Total of 52,693 Jews caught
 11 May: 1 killed, 2 wounded; 931 "Jews and bandits" caught and 53 "bandits" shot. Total of 53,667 Jews caught
 12 May: 0 killed, 1 wounded; 663 caught and 133 shot. Total of 54,463 Jews caught
 13 May: 2 killed, 4 wounded; 561 caught and 155 shot. Total of 55,179 Jews caught
 14 May: 0 killed, 5 wounded; 398 caught and 154 "Jews and bandits" shot. Total of 55,731 Jews caught
 15 May: 0 killed, 1 wounded; 87 caught and 67 "bandits and Jews" shot. Total of 56,885 Jews caught
 16 May: 0 killed, 0 wounded; 180 "Jews, bandits and subhumans destroyed". Total of 57,065 Jews either captured or killed

 Aftermath 

After the uprising was over, most of the incinerated houses were razed, and the Warsaw concentration camp complex was established in their place. Thousands of people died in the camp or were executed in the ruins of the ghetto. At the same time, the SS were hunting down the remaining Jews still hiding in the ruins. On 19 April 1943, the first day of the most significant period of the resistance, 7,000 Jews were transported from the Warsaw Ghetto to Treblinka extermination camp. Many purportedly developed resistance groups, and helped to plan and execute the revolt and mass escape of 2 August 1943.

From May 1943 to August 1944, executions in the ruins of the ghetto were carried out by:

 Officers of the Warsaw SD facility and the security police, under the supervision of Dr. Ludwig Hahn, whose seat was located in Szuch Avenue;
 Pawiak staff members;
 KL Warschau staff members;
 SS-men from the Third Battalion of the 23rd SS Regiment and the Police (Battalion III/SS-Polizei Regiment 23), commanded by Major Otton Bundtke.

Both open and secret executions carried out in Warsaw were repeatedly led by SS-Obersturmführer Norbert Bergh-Trips, SS-Haupturmführer Paul Werner and SS-Obersturmführer Walter Witossek. The latter often presided over the police "trio", signing mass death sentences for Polish political prisoners, which were later pronounced by the ad hoc court of the security police.Regina Domańska: Pawiak... op.cit, p. 417.

In October 1943, Bürkl was tried and condemned to death in absentia by the Polish Resistance's Underground court, and shot dead by the AK in Warsaw, a part of Operation Heads that targeted notorious SS officers. That same month, von Sammern-Frankenegg was killed by Yugoslav Partisans in an ambush in Croatia. Himmler, Globocnik and Krüger all committed suicide at the end of the war in Europe in May 1945.

The General Government Governor of Warsaw at the time of the Uprising, Dr. Ludwig Fischer, was tried and executed in 1947. Stroop was captured by Americans in Germany, convicted of war crimes in two different trials (U.S. military and Polish), and executed by hanging in Poland in 1952, along with Warsaw Ghetto SS administrator Franz Konrad. Stroop's aide, Erich Steidtmann, was exonerated for "minimal involvement"; he died in 2010 while under investigation for war crimes.  Sturmbannführer Hermann Höfle who helped carry out the July 1942 Grossaktion Warsaw committed suicide after being arrested in 1962. Walter Bellwidt, who commanded a Waffen-SS battalion among Stroop forces, died on 13 October 1965. Hahn went into hiding until 1975, when he was apprehended and sentenced to life for crimes against humanity; he served eight years and died in 1986. SS Oberführer Arpad Wigand who served with von Sammern-Frankenberg as SS and Police Leader in Warsaw from 4 August 1941 to 23 April 1943 was tried for war crimes in Hamburg Germany in 1981 and sentenced to 12.5 years in prison; died 26 July 1983. Walter Reder reportedly served in the SS Panzer Grenadier Training Battalion III; he served a jail sentence in Italy from 1951 to 1985 for war crimes committed in 1944 in Italy, and died in 1991. Josef Blösche was tried for war crimes and executed in 1969. Heinrich Klaustermeyer was tried for war crimes in 1965 and sentenced to life in prison. In 1976, he was released from prison on the grounds of his advanced cancer, and died 13 days later.

The Warsaw Ghetto Uprising of 1943 took place over a year before the Warsaw uprising of 1944. The ghetto had been totally destroyed by the time of the general uprising in the city, which was part of the Operation Tempest, a nationwide insurrection plan. During the Warsaw Uprising, the Polish Home Army's Battalion Zośka was able to rescue 380 Jewish prisoners (mostly foreign) held in the concentration camp "Gęsiówka" set up by the Germans in an area adjacent to the ruins of former ghetto. These prisoners had been brought from Auschwitz and forced to clear the remains of the ghetto. A few small groups of ghetto residents also managed to survive in the undetected "bunkers" and to eventually reach the "Aryan side". In all, several hundred survivors from the first uprising took part in the later uprising (mostly in non-combat roles such as logistics and maintenance, due to their physical state and general shortage of arms), joining the ranks of the Polish Home Army and the Armia Ludowa. According to Samuel Krakowski from the Jewish Historical Institute, "The Warsaw Ghetto Uprising had a real influence ... in encouraging the activity of the Polish underground."

A number of survivors of the Warsaw Ghetto Uprising, known as the "Ghetto Fighters", went on to found the kibbutz Lohamei HaGeta'ot (literally: "Ghetto Fighters'"), which is located north of Acre, Israel. The founding members of the kibbutz include Yitzhak Zuckerman (Icchak Cukierman), who represented the ŻOB on the 'Aryan' side, and his wife Zivia Lubetkin, who commanded a fighting unit. In 1984, members of the kibbutz published Daphei Edut ("Testimonies of Survival"), four volumes of personal testimonies from 96 kibbutz members. The settlement features a museum and archives dedicated to remembering the Holocaust. Yad Mordechai, a kibbutz just north of the Gaza Strip, was named after Mordechaj Anielewicz. In 2008, Israel Defense Forces Chief of Staff Gabi Ashkenazi led a group of Israeli officials to the site of the uprising and spoke about the event's "importance for IDF combat soldiers".

In 1968, the 25th anniversary of the Warsaw Ghetto Uprising, Zuckerman was asked what military lessons could be learned from the uprising. He replied:

On 7 December 1970, West German Chancellor Willy Brandt spontaneously knelt while visiting the Monument to the Ghetto Heroes memorial in the People's Republic of Poland. At the time, the action surprised many and was the focus of controversy, but it has since been credited with helping improve relations between the NATO and Warsaw Pact countries.

Many people from the United States and Israel came for the 1983 commemoration.

The last surviving Jewish resistance fighter, Simcha Rotem, died in Jerusalem on 22 December 2018, at age 94.

 Opposing forces 
 Jewish 

Two Jewish underground organisations fought in the Warsaw Uprising: the left wing Żydowska Organizacja Bojowa (ŻOB) founded in July 1942 by Zionist Jewish youth groups within the Warsaw Ghetto; and the right wing Żydowski Związek Wojskowy (ŻZW), or Jewish Military Union, a national organization founded in 1939 by former Polish military officers of Jewish background which had strong ties to the Polish Home Army, and cells in almost every major town across Poland.Maciej Kledzik (October 2002). "ŻZW; Appelbaum w cieniu Anielewicza". Rzeczpospolita (in Polish). 10 (12). 11 October 2002. Retrieved 9 May 2006. However both organisations were officially incorporated into the Polish Home Army and its command structure in exchange for weapons and training.

Marek Edelman, who was the only surviving uprising commander from the left-wing ŻOB, stated that the ŻOB had 220 fighters and each was armed with a handgun, grenades, and Molotov cocktails. His organization had three rifles in each area, as well as two land mines and one submachine gun. Due to its socialist leanings, the Soviets and Israel promoted the actions of ŻOB as the dominant or only party in the Warsaw Ghetto Uprising, a view often adopted by secondary sources in the West.

The right-wing faction ŻZW, which was founded by former Polish officers, was larger, more established and had closer ties with the Polish resistance, making it better equipped. Zimmerman describes the arms supplies for the uprising as "limited but real". Specifically, Jewish fighters of the ŻZW received from the Polish Home Army: 2 heavy machine guns, 4 light machine guns, 21 submachine guns, 30 rifles, 50 pistols, and over 400 grenades for the uprising. During the Warsaw Ghetto Uprising, ŻZW is reported to have had about 400 well-armed fighters grouped in 11 units, with 4 units including fighters from the Polish Home Army. Due to the ŻZW's anti-socialist stand and close ties with the Polish Home Army (which was subsequently outlawed by the Soviets), the Soviets suppressed publication of books and articles on ŻZW after the war and downplayed its role in the uprising, in favor of the more socialist ŻOB. The initially highly Socialist Israel did likewise thus hardly anyone heard of the ŻZW and its leaders. Also, the 1950s best selling American novel Mila 18 by Leon Uris presented the  ŻOB.

More weapons were supplied throughout the uprising, and some were captured from the Germans. Some weapons were handmade by the resistance; sometimes such weapons worked, other times they jammed repeatedly.

Shortly before the uprising, Polish-Jewish historian Emanuel Ringelblum (who managed to escape from the Warsaw Ghetto, but was later discovered and executed in 1944) visited a ŻZW armoury hidden in the basement at 7 Muranowska Street. In his notes, which form part of Oneg Shabbat archives, he reported:

They were armed with revolvers stuck in their belts. Different kinds of weapons were hung in the large rooms: light machine guns, rifles, revolvers of different kinds, hand grenades, bags of ammunition, German uniforms, etc., all of which were utilized to the full in the April "action". (...) While I was there, a purchase of arms was made from a former Polish Army officer, amounting to a quarter of a million zloty; a sum of 50,000 zlotys was paid on account. Two machine guns were bought at 40,000 złoty each, and a large amount of hand grenades and bombs.Yosef Kermisch, "To live with honour and die with honour! Selected documents from the Warsaw Ghetto Undergroung Archives. Oneg Shabbat", Jerusalem, Yad Vashem, 1986.

Due to the nature of the conflict and that it took place within the confines of German-guarded Warsaw Ghetto, the role of the Polish Home Army was primarily one of ancillary support; namely, the provision of arms, ammunition and training. Although the Home Army's stocks were meager, and general provision of arms limited, the right-wing ŻZW received significant quantities of armaments, including some heavy and light machine guns, submachine guns, rifles, pistols and grenades.

 Polish 

According to Marian Fuks, the Ghetto uprising would not have been possible without assistance from the Polish Resistance. Before the uprising started, the most important aid from the Polish resistance to the Jewish resistance took part of weapon smuggling and delivery. Some of the earliest weapons delivered to the ghetto in mid-1942 came from the communist Gwardia Ludowa group, which in August 1942 provided Jewish resistance with 9 pistols and 5 hand grenades'. Antoni Chruściel, commander of the Home Army in Warsaw, ordered the entire armory of the Wola district transferred to the ghetto. In January 1943 the Home Army delivered a larger shipment 50 pistols, 50 hand grenades' and several kilograms of explosives, and together with a number of smaller shipments transferred around that time a total of 70 pistols, 10 rifles, 2 hand machine guns, 1 light machine gun, as well as ammunition and over 150 kilograms of explosives. Acquisition of weapons was supported from both Jewish and Polish funds, including those of Żegota. The Home Army also provided intelligence on German movements, connected Jewish resistance to some black market channels, and provided planning assistance for plans to defend the ghetto and safeguard the refugees. Home Army also disseminated information and appeals to help the Jews in the ghetto, both in Poland and by way of radio transmissions to the Allies, which fell largely on deaf ears.

During the uprising, units from the Polish Home Army and the communist Gwardia Ludowa attacked German units near the ghetto walls and attempted to smuggle weapons, ammunition, supplies, and instructions into the ghetto. The command of the Home Army ordered its sabotage units, Kedyw, to carry a series of actions around the walls against the German units under the code name Ghetto Action. A failed attempt to breach the ghetto walls on 19 April has been described as "one of the first large-scale battles carried out by the Home Army's Warsaw division.". Between 19 and 23 April 1943, the Polish resistance engaged the Germans at six different locations outside the ghetto walls, shooting at German sentries and positions and in one case attempting to blow up a gate. Overall, Home Army conduced seven total operations in support of the uprising. Following two unsuccessful attempt to breach the wall, the other operations focused on harassing Germans and their auxiliaries, inflicting a number of casualies. A National Security Corps unit commanded by Henryk Iwański ("Bystry") reportedly fought inside the ghetto along with ŻZW and subsequently both groups retreated together (including 34 Jewish fighters) to the Aryan side, however later research cast doubts on the veracity of Iwański's claims. Several ŻOB commanders and fighters also later escaped through the tunnels with assistance from the Poles and joined the Polish underground (Home Army).

The failure to break through German defenses limited supplies to the ghetto, which was otherwise cut off from the outside world by a German-ordered blockade. Despite Polish fighters joining the struggle, some survivors criticized gentile Poles for not providing sufficient support; for example in her book On Both Sides of the Wall, Vladka Meed, who was a member of the left-wing ŻOB, devoted a chapter to the insufficient support from the Polish resistance. The Home Army faced a number of dilemmas which resulted in it providing only a limited assistance to the Jewish resistance; those include the fact that it had very limited supplies and was unable to arm its own troops; the view (shared by most of the Jewish reistance) that any wide-scale uprising in 1943 would be premature and futile; and the difficulty to coordinate with the internally divided Jewish resistance, coupled with the pro-Soviet attitude of the ŻOB. Records confirm that the leftist ŻOB received less weaponry and support from the Polish Home Army, unlike the ŻZW with whom the Home Army had close ties and ideological similarities.

 German 

Ultimately, the efforts of the Jewish resistance fighters proved insufficient against the German occupation system. According to Hanna Krall, the German task force dispatched to put down the revolt and complete the deportation action numbered 2,090 men armed with a number of minethrowers and other light and medium artillery pieces, several armored vehicles, and more than 200 machine and submachine guns. Its backbone consisted of 821 Waffen-SS paramilitary soldiers from five SS Panzergrenadier reserve and training battalions and one SS cavalry reserve and training battalion. The other forces were drawn from the Ordnungspolizei (Orpo) order police (battalions from the 22nd and 23rd regiments), Warsaw personnel of the Gestapo and the Sicherheitsdienst (SD) intelligence service, one battalion each from two Wehrmacht (Heer) railroad combat engineers regiments, a Wehrmacht battery of anti-aircraft artillery, a detachment of multinational (commonly but inaccurately referred to by the Germans and Jews alike as "Ukrainians") ex-Soviet POW "Trawniki-Männer" auxiliary camp guards trained by the SS-Totenkopfverbände at Trawniki concentration camp, and technical emergency corps.

Several Gestapo jailers from the nearby political prison Pawiak, led by Franz Bürkl, volunteered to join the "hunt" for the Jews. A force of 363 officers from the Polish Police of the General Government (so-called Blue Police) was ordered by the Germans to cordon the walls of the ghetto. Warsaw fire department personnel were also forced to help in the operation. Jewish policemen were used in the first phase of the ghetto's liquidation and subsequently summarily executed by the Gestapo.

Stroop later remarked:
I had two battalions of Waffen-SS, one hundred army men, units of Order Police, and seventy-five to a hundred Security Police people. The Security Police had been active in the Warsaw Ghetto for some time, and during this program it was their function to accompany SS units in groups of six or eight, as guides and experts in ghetto matters.

By his own words, Stroop reported that after he took command on 19 April 1943, the forces at his disposal totaled 31 officers and 1,262 men:Stroop Report 19 April 1943 at JPFO Site.

Stroop's report listed ultimate forces at his disposal as 36 officers and 2,054 men:

His casualty lists also include members of four other Waffen-SS training and reserve units (1st SS Panzer Grenadier; 2nd SS Panzer Grenadier; 4th SS Panzer Grenadier; 5th SS Panzer Grenadier Training Battalions). Polish police came from the Kommissariarts 1st, 7th and 8th. There is also evidence that German Police of the SSPF of Lubin took part in the liquidation of the Warsaw Ghetto Jews, as did the I Battalion of the 17th SS Police Regiment.

 In popular culture 
The uprising is the subject of numerous works, in multiple media, such as Aleksander Ford's film Border Street (1948), John Hersey's novel The Wall (1950), Leon Uris' novel Mila 18 (1961), Jack P. Eisner's autobiography The Survivor (1980), Andrzej Wajda's films A Generation (1955), Samson (1961), Holy Week (1995), and Jon Avnet's film Uprising (2001).

The photograph of a boy surrendering outside a bunker, with Trawniki with submachine guns in the background, became one of the best-known photographs of World War II and the Holocaust: He is said to represent all 6 million Jewish Holocaust victims.

 See also 
 Destruction of Warsaw
 Sobibor uprising
 Białystok Ghetto uprising
 Ghetto uprisings
 Battle of Muranów Square

 Notes 

 References 

 Bibliography 

 Primary sources 
  Original in Polish: PDF 1.86 MB.

In other languages
 
  — ''

Further reading
 
 
 
 
 
 
  Review

External links 

 Voices From the Inferno: Holocaust Survivors Describe the Last Months in the Warsaw Ghetto, an online exhibition by Yad Vashem
 Rare color photo (not colorized) from Warsaw Ghetto Uprising by Zbigniew Borowczyk (visible Church of St. Anthony of Padua at 31/33 Senatorska Street and burning ghetto).
 The Warsaw Ghetto archive (including The Stroop Report) at Jewish Virtual Library
 Stroop Report online in German and English
 Marek Edelman, The Warsaw Ghetto Uprising
 Pre and post war pictures of the Warsaw Ghetto uprising
Rokhl Auerbakh: Literature as Social Service & the Warsaw Ghetto Soup Kitchen 
Teach about the Warsaw Ghetto Uprising: Classroom Lesson Plans from the Jewish Partisan Educational Foundation

 
1943 in Judaism
1943 in Poland
Battles of World War II involving Germany
Battles involving Poland
Bundism in Europe
Ghetto uprisings
Jewish resistance during the Holocaust
Mass murder in 1943
Military history of Poland during World War II
World War II massacres
Zionism in Poland
The Holocaust in Poland
April 1943 events
May 1943 events
Last stands